Bassett is a city in Chickasaw County, Iowa, United States. The population was 45 at the 2020 census.

Geography
Bassett is located at  (43.062355, -92.515907).

Demographics

2010 census
As of the census of 2010, there were 66 people, 28 households, and 22 families living in the city. The racial makeup of the city was 100.0% White.

There were 28 households, of which 25.0% had children under the age of 18 living with them, 60.7% were married couples living together, 10.7% had a female householder with no husband present, 7.1% had a male householder with no wife present, and 21.4% were non-families. 17.9% of all households were made up of individuals, and 3.6% had someone living alone who was 65 years of age or older. The average household size was 2.36 and the average family size was 2.55.

The median age in the city was 51.5 years. 18.2% of residents were under the age of 18; 0.0% were between the ages of 18 and 24; 18.1% were from 25 to 44; 47% were from 45 to 64; and 16.7% were 65 years of age or older. The gender makeup of the city was 53.0% male and 47.0% female.

2000 census
As of the census of 2000, there were 74 people, 29 households and 18 families living in the city. The racial makeup of the city was 100.00% White.

There were 29 households, out of which 20.7% had children under the age of 18 living with them, 65.5% were married couples living together, and 34.5% were non-families. 20.7% of all households were made up of individuals, and 6.9% had someone living alone who was 65 years of age or older. The average household size was 2.55 and the average family size was 3.16.

In the city, the population was spread out, with 21.6% under the age of 18, 6.8% from 18 to 24, 25.7% from 25 to 44, 31.1% from 45 to 64, and 14.9% who were 65 years of age or older. The median age was 42 years. For every 100 females, there were 100.0 males. For every 100 females age 18 and over, there were 93.3 males.

The median income for a household in the city was $30,000, and the median income for a family was $28,750. Males had a median income of $28,333 versus $9,167 for females. The per capita income for the city was $13,131. There were 16.7% of families and 14.9% of the population living below the poverty line, including no under eighteens and none of those over 64.

References

Cities in Chickasaw County, Iowa
Cities in Iowa